Perriertoppen is the second highest mountain in Svalbard, at 1712 m. It is located in the north east of the island of Spitsbergen. The mountain is late Silurian granite.

References

Mountains of Spitsbergen